The Ealing South by-election of 12 June 1958 was held after the resignation of Conservative Party MP Angus Maude.

The seat had been won by the Conservatives at the 1955 United Kingdom general election by over 12,000 votes.

Result of the previous general election

Result of the by-election

References

1958 in London
Elections in the London Borough of Ealing
1958 elections in the United Kingdom
20th century in Middlesex
By-elections to the Parliament of the United Kingdom in London constituencies
June 1958 events in the United Kingdom